Line 8 or 8 Line may refer to:

Asia

China
Line 8 (Beijing Subway)
Line 8 (Changchun Rail Transit)
Line 8 (Chengdu Metro)
Line 8 (Guangzhou Metro)
Line 8 (Jinan Metro) (planned)
Line 8 (Hangzhou Metro)
Line 8 (Qingdao Metro)
Line 8 (Shanghai Metro)
Line 8 (Shenzhen Metro)
Line 8 (Suzhou Rail Transit) (under construction)
Line 8 (Tianjin Metro) (currently known as Phase 2 of Line 6)
Line 8 (Wuhan Metro)

India
Line 8 (Delhi Metro), or Magenta Line
Line 8 (Mumbai Metro)

Japan
Line 8 (Osaka), or Imazatosuji Line

Malaysia
 KL Monorail, numbered 8

Philippines
MRT Line 8, Metro Manila

Singapore
Line 8 (Singapore), part of the Circle MRT line

South Korea
Seoul Subway Line 8

Australia
Line 8 (Sydney Trains), or Airport & South Line T8

Europe

France
Paris Métro Line 8

Russia
Line 8 (Moscow Metro) and 8A, or Kalininsko–Solntsevskaya line

Spain
Barcelona Metro line 8
Line 8 (Madrid Metro)

Switzerland
S8 (ZVV), Zurich

North America

Cuba
Line 8 (Havana Suburban Railway)

Mexico
Mexico City Metro Line 8

Panama
Line 8 (Panama Metro) (planned)

United States
8 (Los Angeles Railway) (defunct)
8 (New York City Subway service) (defunct)
Route 8 (Baltimore), a bus route, now subsumed by CityLink Red

South America

Brazil
Line 8 (CPTM), São Paulo

Chile
Santiago Metro Line 8

See also
List of public transport routes numbered 8